Graeme Archer may refer to:
 Graeme Archer (cricketer) (born 1970), English cricketer
 Graeme Archer (bowls) (born 1967), Scottish lawn bowler